Sayin Darreh (also Romanized as Sāyīn Darreh) is a village in Kuhpayeh-e Gharbi Rural District, in the Central District of Abyek County, Qazvin Province, Iran. At the 2006 census, its population was 95, in 34 families.

References 

Populated places in Abyek County